Cranz may refer to:

People
 Cranz (surname)

Places
 German name of Zelenogradsk, a town in the Kaliningrad Oblast, Russia
 Cranz, Hamburg a quarter in the Harburg, borough of Hamburg